Docks of San Francisco is a 1932 American pre-Code crime film directed by George B. Seitz and starring Mary Nolan, Jason Robards Sr. and Marjorie Beebe. It was originally released by Mayfair Pictures, and later re-released by Commonwealth Pictures in 1948. The film was long considered to be a lost film but is now on YouTube.

Plot
The plot follows a café waitress who becomes a small-time gangster's mistress and a novelist decides to rescue her from the gangster's clutches.

Cast
 Mary Nolan as Belle
 Jason Robards Sr. as John Banning
 Marjorie Beebe as Rose Gillen
 John Davidson as Vance
 Max Davidson as Max Ranovich, the Detective
 Arthur Millett as 	Police Chief Rafferty 
 Ernie Adams as Cookie 
 Walter James as 	Phony Café Waiter
 George Chesebro as 	Vance's Henchman 
 Hal Price as 	Vance's Henchman
 Charles McAvoy	as 	Policeman 
 Frank Meredith as 	Plainclothesman 
 Paul Panzer as 	Café Waiter

References

Bibliography
 Pitts, Michael R. Poverty Row Studios, 1929–1940: An Illustrated History of 55 Independent Film Companies, with a Filmography for Each. McFarland & Company, 2005.

External links

1932 films
1932 crime films
1930s rediscovered films
American crime films
American black-and-white films
Films directed by George B. Seitz
Rediscovered American films
Mayfair Pictures films
1930s English-language films
Films set in San Francisco
1930s American films